Deborah Harmon (born May 8, 1951) is an American film and television actress.

Harmon was born in Chicago, Illinois. She attended The Second City troupe in Chicago until moving to Los Angeles to pursue an active acting career. She is probably best remembered for her role as Elizabeth Lubbock in the ABC television series Just the Ten of Us which was a spin-off of Growing Pains where she first appeared in the role for two episodes in 1988. She also was a regular on the short lived television series The Ted Knight Show and Leo & Liz in Beverly Hills. She has also had parts in films such as Bachelor Party (1984) and Back to the Future (1985), and co-starred with Kurt Russell in the 1980 comedy Used Cars.

Filmography
Imps* (2009) .... Mom (segment "3-Mile Island People)
Malcolm in the Middle as Parent Volunteer (1 episode, 2002)
Son of the Beach as Pussy Willow (1 episode, 2002)
Clueless as Rebecca Morgan (2 episodes, 1997)
Married... with Children as Mimi Stokes / ... (2 episodes, 1987–1996)
Boy Meets World as Connie (1 episode, 1995)
The Mommies as Susan (1 episode, 1995)
Mr. Payback: An Interactive Movie (1995)  .... Medical Center Woman
Sisters as Judy Burns (1 episode, 1994)
True Facts (1992) (TV)
Dear John as Wendy Lacey (2 episodes, 1990–1991)
Just the Ten of Us as Elizabeth Lubbock (47 episodes, 1988–1990)
Growing Pains as Elisabeth / ... (2 episodes, 1988)
Tales from the Darkside as Katie Weiderman (1 episode, 1987)
Sledge Hammer! as Angelica Delmonte (1 episode, 1987)
St. Elsewhere as Sally (1 episode, 1987)
CBS Summer Playhouse as Shirley (1 episode, 1987)
Baby Girl Scott (1987) (TV) .... Terri
When the Bough Breaks (1986) (TV) .... Lisa
All Is Forgiven as Sharon Russell (1 episode, 1986)
Leo & Liz in Beverly Hills (1986) TV series .... Diane Fedderson
Prince of Bel Air (1986) (TV) .... Carol Kampion
The Twilight Zone as Hostess (segment 'But Can She Type?') (1 episode, 1985)
George Burns Comedy Week (1 episode, 1985)
Back to the Future (1985) (uncredited) .... TV Newscaster
Night Court as Sue Harper, Public Defender (1 episode, 1985)
My Wicked, Wicked Ways... The Legend of Errol Flynn (1985) (TV) .... Prudence
Bachelor Party (1984) .... Ilene
The Facts of Life as Gail Gallagher (1 episode, 1983)
M*A*S*H as Nurse Webster (2 episodes, 1982)
Comedy of Terrors (1981) (TV) .... Molly Sutherland
Tales of the Unexpected as Daisy Flock (1 episode, 1981)
Used Cars (1980) .... Barbara Jane Fuchs
The T.V. Show (1979) (TV) .... Various Characters
Quincy M.E. as Judy (1 episode, 1979)
Space Force (1978) .... Ship's Crier
The Paper Chase as Jeannie (1 episode, 1978)
The Ted Knight Show (1978) TV series .... Joy (1978)
The Ghost of Flight 401 (1978) (TV) .... Mary Smith
Laverne & Shirley as Receptionist (1 episode, 1976)

References

External links
 

1951 births
Living people
American television actresses
Actresses from Chicago
21st-century American women